Yukon Manhunt is a 1951 American Northern film directed by Frank McDonald and starring Kirby Grant, Gail Davis and Margaret Field. The film was the sixth in the series of ten films featuring Kirby Grant as a Canadian Mountie.

Plot

Cast
 Kirby Grant as Corporal Rod Webb  
 Gail Davis as Jane Kenmore  
 Margaret Field as Polly Kaufman  
 Rand Brooks as Len Kaufman  
 Nelson Leigh as Kenmore  
 John Doucette as Charles Benson  
 Paul McGuire as Le Clerque 
 Dennis Moore as Henchman

See also
 Trail of the Yukon (1949)
 The Wolf Hunters (1949)
 Snow Dog (1950)
 Call of the Klondike (1950)
 Northwest Territory (1951)
 Yukon Gold (1952)
 Fangs of the Arctic (1953)
 Northern Patrol (1953)
 Yukon Vengeance (1954)

References

Bibliography
 Drew, Bernard. Motion Picture Series and Sequels: A Reference Guide. Routledge, 2013.

External links
 

1951 films
1951 Western (genre) films
American Western (genre) films
American black-and-white films
Corporal Rod Webb (film series)
1950s English-language films
Films based on American novels
Films based on works by James Oliver Curwood
Films directed by Frank McDonald
Films produced by Lindsley Parsons
Films set in Yukon
Monogram Pictures films
Northern (genre) films
Royal Canadian Mounted Police in fiction
1950s American films